East Coast Radio (ECR) is a KwaZulu-Natal commercial South African radio station with an audience of approximately 5 million. It is one of the largest regional radio stations in South Africa.

The station can also be heard online via its website and on channel 26 via Digital Worldspace Radio and is also available for listen on their app which is downloadable from the App Store and Google Play Store. It broadcasts from Umhlanga, KwaZulu-Natal. In November 2019, East Coast Radio had enabled a new online feature to listeners called East Coast Gold, which enables them to play music from the 1960s and the years that succeeded it.

East Coast Radio started as Radio Port Natal, broadcasting from the SABC studios in Old Fort Road, Durban on 1 May 1967. When the station upgraded its technology to include stereo broadcasts, it was rebranded to RPN Stereo. It was sold to the Kagiso Media Group on 1 July 1994.

The list of former radio presenters includes Daryl Ilbury, Alan Khan, Dave Guselli, Di Brophy, Damon Beard, Paul Harper, Tim Thabethe, Clayton Robbertze, Omar Essack, Mags van der Westhuizen, Mel Massyn, Makhosi Khoza, Lev David and Ravi R, Minnie Ntuli, amongst others. And the current presenters are, Daren Maule, Ker Miller, Sky Shabalala, Carol Ofori, Vick Naidoo, Stacey Norman, J Sbu, Tee Xaba, Sam Cele, Mike V, Buhle Hlatshwayo, Andy James, Nick Taithen.  

ECR is also a leading host in the Province of KwaZulu-Natal, planning and putting on great events, such as The Toy Story charity drive, The Big Walk, and even Durban Day. ECR dominates in the affluent LSM 6-10 urban group in KwaZulu-Natal with an operating profit margin of 50.8% in 2006.

East Coast Radio is a sister station to Jacaranda FM based in Pretoria.

In 2015 the station appointed former KZN Tourism Marketing manager Boni Mchunu as its General Manager.

East Coast Radio has long term sponsorship partnerships with sports teams based in KwaZulu-Natal, including Super Rugby outfit, The Sharks, soccer outfit AmaZulu as well as cricket franchise The Sunfoil Dolphins.

The station has won several coveted MTN radio awards including the 2011 prize for Best News and Actuality Producer for "150 Years: Relive The Legacy."

The feature, which aired from 1 November to 16 November 2010 looking back to when the first indentured Indians arrived in South Africa.

In 2014 The Drive with Damon team won an MTN Radio Award for Best Promotions/Stunt, while the station's imaging producer, Salendran Thulukanam, was honoured as an MTN Radio Awards Bright Star.

In 2015 Damon Beard, who hosts The Big Favour every week, where deserving individuals and organisations receive assistance, trumped other national nominees to be named Best Community Project.

East Coast Radio journalist, Khatija Nxedlana, was recognised as a young achiever. She was honoured with membership to the exclusive MTN Radio Awards Bright Stars Club.

East Coast Radio Big walk

The Big Walk is KZN's largest outdoor event with 30 000 walkers annually. The first edition of the event which was held in 2004 had just over 1 800 participants. The walk has 5 km, 10 km, 15 km and 20 km routes.

Durban Day.

Durban day is an annual outdoor music event hosted by East Coast Radio every September. The event has been held annually at the Moses Mabhida Stadium People's Park in recent years and attracts over 15 000 music lovers. Some of South Africa's top music acts have graced the Durban Day including Lira, Prime Circle, AKA, Khuli Chana, Mango Groove and The Parlotones.

ECR Toy Story

East Coast Radio Toy Story is the station's annual CSI initiative and seeks to collect toys and cash donations for underprivileged children in KwaZulu-Natal. The drive has been running for more than 15 years and has grown year on year since its inception. In 2015 more than 100 000 new toys were donated to charity drive.

As part of the initiative East Coast Radio hosts its Corporate Day Challenge. Here celebrities and jocks from the station donate their time to take pledges from corporates. In 2014, a record-breaking R1.6 million was raised, the following year just over R1.2 million was  raised during the challenge.

Broadcast time
Weekdays (Monday-Friday)

 00:00-04:00 tbc

 04:00-06:00 tbc

 06:00-10:00 East Coast Breakfast with Darren, Kerry and Sky

 10:00-13:00 Carol Ofori

 13:00-16:00 Vic Naidoo

 16:00-19:00 Stacey & J Sbu

 18:00-21:00 East Coast Urban

 18:00-22:00 East Coast Party People (Friday)

 21:00-00:00 Trending tonight with Sirshin Moodliar (Monday-Thursday)

 22:00-02:00 Londeka Shabane (Friday)

Weekends (Saturday-Sunday)

Saturday
 02:00-06:00 Tbc

 06:00-10:00 The Weekend Breakfast with Ricky

 10:00-14:00 New 40 with Carol Ofori

 14:00-18:00 Tbc

 18:00-22:00 East Coast Party People with Deon Govender

 22:00-02:00 Londeka Shabane

Sunday
 02:00-06:00 Josh Bhengu

 06:00-10:00 The Weekend Breakfast with Ricky

 10:00-14:00 The Bongani Mtolo Show

 14:00-18:00 Tbc

 18:00-21:00 Play Local with Msizi James

 21:00-00:00 The Experiment

Listenership figures

References

External links
East Coast Radio

Radio stations in Durban